= Timeship (video game) =

1985 video game

- Developer(s): Five Star Software
- Publisher(s): Five Star Software
- Release: 1985
- Genre(s): Role-playing

Timeship is a video game published by Five Star Software.

== Gameplay ==
Timeship is a game in which the players are able to travel through the time stream in a role-playing adventure.

== Reception ==
Jasper Sylvester reviewed the game for Computer Gaming World, and stated that "I am impressed with TS as a potentially interesting game system, but was disappointed with the way the introductory module failed to make use of the strengths of the system."
